Albert Agarunovich Agarunov (25 April 1969 – 8 May 1992) is a Jewish National Hero of Azerbaijan and Starshina of the Azerbaijani Army who died during the First Nagorno-Karabakh War. He was among Azerbaijanis defending Shusha, which was captured by Armenian forces during the Battle of Shusha on May 9, 1992.

Life
Albert Agarunov was born in a Baku suburb to Mountain Jewish parents, Agarun, who was an oil-worker from Quba, and Leah Agarunov. Albert was one of the family's ten children. During his school years, Albert was interested in music, and he took trumpet lessons. After obtaining a degree in technology, he started working at a machine building factory, as a metal turner. His brother, Rantik Agarunov, stated that: "The only thing Albert did not like, was aggression and abusive attitudes towards the vulnerable."

Military service

He served in the Soviet Army from 1987 to 1989 in Georgia. Agarunov was a tank commander during his military service.

Participation in Nagorno-Karabakh Conflict
In 1991, Agarunov voluntarily enlisted in the Azerbaijani Army in the war against ethnic Armenian separatists in the Nagorno-Karabakh region, becoming a tank commander.

In May 1992, Armenian forces launched a successful assault to capture the strategically important town of Shusha, in order to break the Siege of Stepanakert. Agarunov fought in a battalion led by Elchin Mammadov during the battle, where he took part in a tank engagement against an Armenian T-72 commanded by Gagik Avsharian, successfully disabling the tank.

Death and commemorations
Commander Haji Azimov said that Agarunov left his vehicle to remove the bodies of dead Azerbaijani soldiers lying on the streets, and he was hit by sniper fire. Agarunov was killed on the road connecting Shusha to Lachin on 8 May 1992. Agarunov was posthumously awarded the title of National Hero of Azerbaijan and was buried at Martyrs' Lane in Baku in May 1992, attended by both Imams and Rabbis. The school in Baku from which Albert graduated was renamed after him.

In 2017, a memorial plaque was placed in Albert Agarunov's house in Amirjan settlement of Surakhani district.

In 2020, a monument honoring him, including a giant statue of Agarunov, was unveiled in Baku.

Awards
  (1992) — National Hero of Azerbaijan
  (2014) — "Son of the Fatherland" order 
  (2016) — Hazi Aslanov medal

References

External links
 A Jewish Warrior in a Muslim Land

1969 births
1992 deaths
Military personnel from Baku
Azerbaijani military personnel of the Nagorno-Karabakh War
Azerbaijani military personnel killed in action
Azerbaijani Jews
Mountain Jews
National Heroes of Azerbaijan